Hugo Aquino (born 4 April 1993) is a Paraguayan footballer who plays as a left back.

References

External links
 
 
 
 

1993 births
Living people
Paraguayan footballers
Paraguayan Primera División players
Club Sportivo San Lorenzo footballers
Cerro Porteño players
Deportivo Capiatá players
Association football defenders